Hanil Bank Football Club is a defunct football club in South Korea. The side spent three  seasons in the K-League from 1984–1986.  It was led by Kim Ho, who later coached the Daejeon Citizen and Suwon Samsung Bluewings. Hanil Bank was dissolved in December 1998.

Statistics

Managers
 1970–1983 :  Kang Jun-Young
 1983–1987 :  Kim Ho
 1993 :  Cho Seong-Kyu

References

K League clubs
B
Association football clubs established in 1970
Association football clubs disestablished in 1998
Financial services association football clubs in South Korea